Fairleigh Dickinson University Press (FDU Press) is a publishing house under the operation and oversight of Fairleigh Dickinson University, the largest private university in New Jersey, which has international campuses in Vancouver, British Columbia and Wroxton, Oxfordshire.

History
FDU Press was established in 1967 by the university's founder Peter Sammartino, in cooperation with the publisher Thomas Yoseloff, formerly the director of University of Pennsylvania Press. Yoseloff had left this position in the previous year to found Associated University Presses (AUP), intended to operate as a consortium of small-to-medium-sized university presses and publisher/distributor of humanities scholarship. FDU Press became the first participating member of AUP in 1968.

Charles Angoff was the chief editor of FDU Press from 1967 to 1977. Harry Keyishian was director of the press from 1977 to 2017, and remains on its Editorial Committee. James Gifford is the current director of FDU Press. When AUP ceased most new publishing in 2010, a new distribution agreement was struck with Rowman & Littlefield. The press relocated to FDU's Vancouver Campus in July 2017, but retains its Editorial Committee composed of faculty from the university's campuses and Advisory Board composed of faculty and publishing professionals from outside FDU.

FDU Press has issued over 1500 non-fiction and research titles since its inception, the majority in the fields of literature, literary criticism, arts, history and social sciences.

See also

 List of English-language book publishing companies
 List of university presses

References

External links
 FDU Press website

Fairleigh Dickinson University
University presses of the United States
Book publishing companies based in New Jersey
Publishing companies established in 1967
1967 establishments in New Jersey